Taekwondo events have been contested at Universiade since 2003 Games in Daegu, South Korea, with one exception in  2013 in Kazan, Russia

Editions

Events
Medals are awarded in ten different weight classes for both men and women.

Medal table 
Last updated after the 2019 Summer Universiade

References
Sports123

 
Sports at the Summer Universiade
Universiade